Absolute Magnitude is an American discontinued, semi-professional science fiction magazine started in Spring/Summer 1993 issue under the name Harsh Mistress. However, in 1994 after only two issues the name was changed to Absolute Magnitude.  In 2002 the name was changed again to Absolute Magnitude & Aboriginal Science Fiction when the publishers acquired the rights to Aboriginal Science Fiction. Absolute Magnitude was published by DNA Publications and edited by Warren Lapine. During this period it was headquartered in Radford, Virginia. Although it was supposed to be a quarterly magazine its actual releases were irregular. After releasing twenty-one issues under the Absolute Magnitude title (plus two as Harsh  Mistress), Spring 2005 issue was the final issue of the magazine.

Absolute Magnitude was nominated for the 2002 Hugo Award for Best Semiprozine with Lapine noted as the editor.

Anthology 
Absolute Magnitude is also a collection of sixteen stories taken from the magazine between 1993 and 1997.  The anthology was published by Tor Books and was released on April 15, 1997.  It has been issued in both hardcover and paperback editions.

Contributors 
Authors who worked for the magazine included:
 Ben Bova
 Terry Bisson
 Hal Clement
 Alan Dean Foster
 Barry B. Longyear
 Allen Steele, columnist: Primary Ignition
 William F. Wu

See also
 List of defunct American periodicals

References

1993 establishments in the United States
2005 disestablishments in the United States
Defunct science fiction magazines published in the United States
Irregularly published magazines published in the United States
Magazines established in 1993
Magazines disestablished in 2005
Magazines published in Virginia
Science fiction magazines established in the 1990s